The Jangjin Line (長津線, Chōshin-sen) was a  narrow gauge railway line of the Chōsen Railway of colonial-era Korea, located in South Hamgyeong Province. There is a  cable-hauled section between Samgo and Hwangch'oryong; between Pojang and Hwangch'oryong the grade reaches 370‰.

History
In 1934, to aid in the construction of a new hydroelectric power plant on the Jangjin River, and to exploit forestry and other resources in the area, the Sinheung Railway, a subsidiary of the Chōsen Railway began construction of a new line from Sangtong, terminus of its Hamnam Line. The first section, from Sangtong to Samgeo, was opened on 1 September 1934, followed by an extension from Samgeo to Gujin on 1 November of the same year.

Later, the Sindae—Gujin section was closed on 15 July 1935, followed by the closure of the Sasu—Sindae section on 30 August 1935.

The Sinheung Railway was absorbed by Chōtetsu on 22 April 1938, which divided the Hamnam Line, naming the Sangtong–Sasu line Jangjin Line.

After the partition of Korea, the line was located in the territory of North Korea, and was nationalised to become part of the Korean State Railway. The Jangjin Line was subsequently merged with part of the Hamnam Line to create the present-day Changjin Line.

Services
In the November 1942 timetable, the last issued prior to the start of the Pacific War, Chōtetsu operated the following schedule of third-class-only local passenger services:

Route

References

Rail transport in North Korea
Rail transport in Korea
Korea under Japanese rule
Defunct railway companies of Japan
Defunct railway companies of Korea
Chosen Railway